In taxonomy, Thermofilum is a genus of the Thermofilaceae.

Thermofilum pendens is a hyperthermic member of the archael kingdom Crenarchaeota, and represents a deep branch in the order Thermoproteales.  T. pendens lacks the genes for purine nucleotide biosynthesis and thus relies on environmental sources to meet its purine requirements.

Taxonomy
Cladogram was taken from GTDB release 06-RS202. Taxonomy from List of Prokaryotic names with Standing in Nomenclature (LPSN) and National Center for Biotechnology Information (NCBI).

References

Further reading

Scientific journals

Scientific books

Scientific databases

External links

Type strain of Thermofilum pendens at BacDive -  the Bacterial Diversity Metadatabase

Archaea genera
Thermoproteota

ko:테르모필룸속